Sióagárd is a village in Tolna county, Hungary.

References

External links

Populated places in Tolna County